Firwood is an unincorporated community in Clackamas County, Oregon, United States. It is located about 3 miles southeast of Sandy just off U.S. Route 26. The junction of U.S. 26 and Firwood Road is known as Shortys Corner.

Firwood is a descriptive name for the Douglas and true firs in the area. Firwood post office was established in 1895 and closed in 1906. Today Firwood has a Sandy mailing address. Firwood Elementary School is part of the Oregon Trail School District.

References

External links
 Images of Firwood from Flickr

Unincorporated communities in Clackamas County, Oregon
1895 establishments in Oregon
Populated places established in 1895
Unincorporated communities in Oregon